The 22nd Golden Eagle Awards were held September 26, 2006, in Changsha, Hunan province.  Nominees and winners are listed below, winners are in bold.

Television Series

Best Television Series
Song of Yanan/延安颂Great Dyehouse/大染坊
The Greatest Building/天下第一楼

Best Mini-seriesFu Baoshi/傅抱石Country Teacher/乡村女教师
Great Sun/好太阳
Liang Shikui/梁世奎
Lipstic/没有抹完的口红

Best Directing in a Television SeriesYang Yazhou for The Most Romantic Thing

Best Writing in a Television Series
Wang Chaozhu for Song of Yanan
Hai Yan for Goddess of Mercy

Best Actor in a Television Series
Hou Yong for Great Dyehouse
Chen Jianbin for Ten Years of Our Marriage
Tong Dawei for Goddess of Mercy
Hu Jun for The Eight Creatures
Liu Jin for Song of Yanan

Best Actress in a Television Series
Wang Ji for The Greatest Building
Chen Hao for Pink Girls
Sun Li for Goddess of Mercy
Ni Ping for The Most Romantic Thing
Xi Meijuan for To be the Banker or Dealer

Best Art Direction in a Television Series
Zhao Guoliang/Lan Ling/He Ming for Kong Yiji

Best Cinematography in a Television Series
Shen Xinghao/Ye Zhiwei for The Eight Creatures

Best Lighting in a Television Series
Zhang Xiaojun for Great Dyehouse

Best Sound Recording in a Television Series
Li Jinjun for The Land

Favorite Actor
Liu Jin for Song of Yanan

Favorite Actress
Sun Li for Goddess of Mercy

Outstanding Contribution Award
Tang Guoqiang

Literature & Art Program

Best Literature and Art Program
2004 CCTV New Year's Gala/中央电视台春节联欢晚会2004 Shandong TV Spring Festival Gala/2004年山东电视台春节安徽
80 Years Anniversary of Dongbei University/辉煌80—庆祝东北大学建校八十周年文艺晚会
The 4th Golden Eagle Art Festival-TV New Performer Selection第四届中国金鹰电视艺术节电视新秀大赛总决赛晚会
2004 Hubei-Xinjia Spring Festival Gala/里舞春风—2004年湖北新疆春节晚会
Song Zuying-Vienna Concert/宋祖英维也纳金色大厅独唱音乐会
与时代和人民同行—江苏省"五个一工程" 颁奖暨优秀作品十年回顾电视文艺晚会
The Same Song Special Program-Spring Festival Memories/《同一首歌》春节特辑—〈记忆中的歌声〉(二)

Best Directing for a Literature and Art ProgramTian Yuan/Bai Yuqi for 金庸华山论剑

Best Cinematography for a Literature and Art Program
Cinematography group for 2005 CCTV New Year's Gala

Best Art Direction for a Literature and Art Program
Chen Yan for 2004 CCTV's New Year Gala

Best Lighting for a Literature and Art Program
Yang Hansong for Yangzhou International Travel Festival Opening Gala

Documentary

Best Television Documentary
The Revived Leigon/复活的军团'Shanxin Businessman/山西Kinggadern/幼儿园
Ba Jin/百年巴金
Chen Xiaomin Rush to City/陈小梅进城

Best Short DocumentaryShangri-la's Lu Sha/萨马阁的路沙22 Hours/惊心动魄22小时
Rhythm/律动
Snakes and Birds/蛇.鸟.蛇
River's Emotion/江河情怀

Best Writing and Directing for a Television DocumentaryJin Mu for The Revived Leigon

Best Cinematography for a Television Documentary
Liao Tao/Zhao Xinmin for Shangri-la's Lu Sha

Best Sound Recording for a Television Documentary
He Fang/Zhao Min for 22 Hours

Children & Teens Program

Best Animation
Nezha/哪吒传奇
Martin Morning/马丁的早晨
Seven and Half Heroes/英雄七个半

References

External links

2004
2006 in Chinese television
Events in Changsha
Mass media in Changsha